is a former Japanese football player.

Playing career
Tomita was born in Kyoto on May 8, 1980. He joined J1 League club Kyoto Purple Sanga from youth team in 1999. On August 14, he debuted as forward against Nagoya Grampus Eight. His opportunity to play gradually decreased from 2000. He played many matches as offensive midfielder from 2001 and the club won the champions 2002 Emperor's Cup first major title in the club history. However he could hardly play in the match behind new member Daisuke Hoshi and Daishi Kato in 2005. In 2006, he moved to Japan Football League (JFL) club Arte Takasaki and played in 1 season. In June 2007, he moved to Regional Leagues club FC Mi-O Biwako Kusatsu. The club was promoted to JFL from 2008. He retired end of 2008 season.

Club statistics

References

External links

kyotosangadc

1980 births
Living people
Association football people from Kyoto Prefecture
Japanese footballers
J1 League players
J2 League players
Japan Football League players
Kyoto Sanga FC players
Arte Takasaki players
MIO Biwako Shiga players
Association football midfielders